The Seiyu Award for Best Actor in a Leading Role is one of the awards at the Seiyu Awards.

Winners

References

Seiyu Awards